Heyrman is a surname. Notable people with the surname include:

Christine Leigh Heyrman, American historian
Hugo Heyrman (born 1942), Belgian artist
Laura Heyrman (born 1993), Belgian volleyball player